Bawku Central is one of the constituencies represented in the Parliament of Ghana. It elects one Member of Parliament (MP) by the first past the post system of election. Bawku Central is located in the Bawku Municipal district  of the Upper East Region of Ghana.

Boundaries
The seat is located within the Bawku Municipal District in the Upper East Region of Ghana. Prior to the 2004 parliamentary election, the Pusiga constituency was carved out of the pre-existing Bawku Central constituency in what was then known as the Bawku East District. The current constituency is thus smaller in area than that preceding the 2004 election.

Members of Parliament 
The current MP is Mahama Ayariga who was elected in the December 2020 elections. Ayariga was the member of Ghana's parliament for the Bawku Central constituency from 2005 but lost his seat in the 2008 Elections to Adamu Dramani Sakande of the NPP. The seat became vacant when Adamu was convicted and jailed by a court for having stood for the election while being the citizen of another country which is against the Ghana constitution. Ayariga recaptured the seat in the 2012 General Elections. He has been elected as the member of parliament for this constituency in the fourth, sixth, seventh and eighth parliament of the fourth Republic of Ghana. 

Adamu Dramani Sakande was jailed for 2 years by the Supreme Court of Ghana for forgery on 27 July 2012. This follows a case brought in the High court by Mr Sumaila Biebel, a cattle dealer in 2009 stating that Dramani did not qualify to be an MP as he held both a British and a Burkinabé passport.

Elections

See also
List of Ghana Parliament constituencies

References 

Parliamentary constituencies in the Upper East Region